Omicron Herculis, Latinized from o Herculis, is a star in the constellation Hercules. It used to be called Masym ("the wrist"), but this name was transferred to Lambda Herculis.

Properties 

Omicron Herculis is a B9.5III star approximately 106 pc from the Earth. It has an apparent magnitude of 3.83. The star radiates with a bluish-white hue, and has a luminosity approximately 355 times as bright as the Sun. Omicron Herculis is 3.49 solar masses.  Stellar evolutionary caclulations show that it has just left the main sequence.

Omicron Herculis is an eruptive variable of the Gamma Cassiopeiae class, which are rapidly rotating B-class stars with mass outflow. It has a projected rotational velocity of 194 km/s.

Some sources list Omicron Herculis as being both spectroscopic and an interferometric binary star with a separation of about 60 milliarcseconds, although the companion star has not been confirmed.

Omicron Hercules is notable for residing close to the coordinates of the solar apex, the direction towards which the Sun is moving. This was first noticed by William Herschel in 1783, although in his first calculation he identified this point with Lambda Herculis. It will eventually become the brightest star in the night sky in approximately 3.47 million years from today, at –0.63, slightly less bright than Canopus today.

References

External links
 http://www.alcyone.de/SIT/bsc/HR6779.html

Hercules (constellation)
Herculis, Omicron
Herculis, 103
B-type giants
088794
6779
BD+28 2925
166014